All in the Family is a 1975 Hong Kong comedy film, directed by Mu Zhu and produced under Golden Harvest productions. Despite starring in the film, Jackie Chan does not appear until 1 hour into the movie.

Plot
A family gathers to be with their dying father. The reunion brings old rivalries to the surface.

Mr. Hu is dying, so he calls his family to his bedside. After his death, his three sons divide Mr. Hu's belongings, leaving their mother and sister with nothing. Between them, the sister and mother came up with a plan to get revenge. The sister starts a rumor that her mother is actually very rich, when hearing the rumor, the three sons quickly return home and try to gain their mother's favor in the hope of getting the money from her.

Spring Lady is tiring of her husband, Ma, and has an eye on Little Tang, a rickshaw boy. Little Tang is in love with Lin-tze, but as Lin-tze is happily married to Chang Hsun, his attentions are soon swayed by Spring Lady. Although Ma discovers the affair, he is too busy to care.

Cast
Jackie Chan
Sammo Hung
Dean Shek
James Tien

Overview
Chan plays a rickshaw driver. It contains one of only two sex scenes which Chan has done, the other one being in Shinjuku Incident. It is the only film Chan has starred in where there wasn't a single fight or stunt sequence.

In 2006, Information Times quoted Chan's response to an article in the Hong Kong media regarding the film, referring to it as a pornographic film. However, the film is not actually pornography.

See also
 Jackie Chan filmography
 Sammo Hung filmography

References

External links
 All in the Family (film) at HKcinemamagic.com
 

1975 films
Hong Kong comedy films
1975 comedy films
1970s Hong Kong films